Boissieu (or Boissieux) is a French proper name originating in middle and eastern France (Auvergne, Lyon, Alpes), probably meaning "woody place" ("bois" means wood in French).

Families
Several French noble families bear the name Boissieu, including:
 The family de Boissieu or Boissieu du Forez, originally from Forez, near Lyon, in the 16th century
 The family Boissieu d'Auvergne or Boissieu de la Geneste, originating from La Chapelle-Geneste (Haute-Loire) in 1316
 The family Perrin de Boissieu or Boissieu-Perrin, later called Salvaing de Boissieu, originally from the Dauphiné. A line of this family later settled in Aunis (18th century) and Normandy (19th century).

People
 Jean-Jacques de Boissieu (1736-1810), the French artist and engraver
 Henri Louis Augustin de Boissieu (1741-1795), French general
 Joseph Hugues Boissieu La Martinière (1758-1788), French doctor of medicine, botanist and biologist
 Claude Victor de Boissieu (1783-1868), the French artist and local politician
 Henri de Boissieu (1871-1912), French botanist, see Astilbe
 Alain de Boissieu (1914-2006), general son-in-law of the general Charles de Gaulle
 Pierre de Boissieu (born 1945), French diplomat and former French ambassador to the European Union
 Christian de Boissieu (born 1947), professor of economics at Paris I Panthéon-Sorbonne university

French-language surnames